Travis Scott Van Winkle (born November 4, 1982) is an American actor, best known for starring in the feature film Accepted (2006) and the 2021 third season of the Netflix streaming television series You, portraying Trent Sutton-DeMarco in Transformers (2007), Friday the 13th (2009) and Lieutenant Danny Green in The Last Ship (2014–2018).

Early life 
Van Winkle was born in Victorville, California, the middle of three children of Sally (née Fitzgerald) and Charles Van Winkle. When he was two years old, his family moved to Oscoda, Michigan. When he was eight, his family moved again to Peachtree City, Georgia, where he graduated from McIntosh High School and attended the University of West Georgia but did not graduate, leaving at age 20 to pursue his acting endeavors in Hollywood.

Career 
Van Winkle made his television debut in a December 2004 episode of the Fox sitcom Quintuplets, and has since appeared in shows such as That's So Raven, Malcolm in the Middle, The O.C., and 7th Heaven. His film credits include one of the leads in Fox's Meet the Spartans, David R. Ellis's film Asylum, Universal's Accepted and Michael Bay's Transformers. While he has modeled for Abercrombie & Fitch shot by Bruce Weber, Van Winkle appeared in New Line/Paramount's 2009 reboot of Friday the 13th (another Bay production) as Trent Sutton-DeMarco, the character he previously portrayed in Transformers. He also appeared in Julianne Hough's 2008 music video for "That Song in My Head".

In 2011, Van Winkle starred in the suspense thriller film 247°F co-starring Scout Taylor-Compton. In 2012, he starred in the independent comedy Last Call. He also appeared in the thriller Bloodwork, co-starring Tricia Helfer.

In 2011 and 2012, Van Winkle made guest appearances in television series such as Happy Endings, 2 Broke Girls, and Two and a Half Men. In October 2012, he was cast as Lieutenant Daniel Joshua "Danny" Green, leader of the Naval Mountain Warfare Special Forces Unit aboard the Nathan James, in the TNT action drama pilot The Last Ship, also executively produced by Bay. The series premiered on TNT on 22 June 2014. In December 2012, he was cast in a recurring role as Jonah on the second season of The CW's series Hart of Dixie.

In 2014, Van Winkle starred in the comedy film Mantervention. He also guest starred in an episode of Scorpion. In 2015, he starred in the PixL original movie Bound & Babysitting alongside Tammin Sursok.

In 2017, Van Winkle starred as Scott Hays in Hallmark channel original movie Christmas Getaway alongside Bridget Regan.

In 2019, Van Winkle appeared in the film Senior Love Triangle as the character Spencer.

In October 2020, Van Winkle was cast in the main role of Cary Conrad on the third season of the Netflix thriller series You.

In 2022, it was announced that he will be appearing in the upcoming Amazon Prime Video remake of the 1989 film Road House.

Filmography

Film

Television

Web

Music videos

References

External links 
 
 
 
 

1982 births
21st-century American male actors
American Bahá'ís
American male film actors
American male television actors
Living people
Male actors from California
People from Victorville, California
Male actors from Georgia (U.S. state)
People from Peachtree City, Georgia
People from Oscoda, Michigan